PΑC Omonia 29M (Greek: ΑΛΣ Ομόνοια 29Μ; Αθλητικό Λαϊκό Σωματείο Ομόνοια 29ης Μαΐου; People's Athletic Club Omonia 29 May), commonly known as PAC Omonia, ALS Omonia or Omonia 29M, is a Cypriot professional football club based in Nicosia. PAC Omonia 29M was formed on 29 May 2018 by Gate 9, AC Omonia's ultras, due to a disagreement regarding the ownership of the club. They currently play in the Cypriot Second Division.

History

Separation from AC Omonia 

Financial difficulties led AC Omonia to change its stance on the ownership of their football department, officially converting from complete fan-ownership to a for-profit ownership under American-Cypriot businessman Stavros Papastavrou, on 29 May 2018. The Gate 9 supporter group were unhappy with the change, and on the same day, decided to form a breakaway club. The club was officially founded on 23 July 2018, under the name PAC Omonia 1948. In 2020, the club was renamed as PAC Omonia 29M, for legal reasons.

Rise to the Second Division 

In August 2018, Omonia 29M joined the Pansoleio Sports Federation, which hosts an amateur league in the 5th tier of Cypriot football. In their first active season, Omonia 29M won the 2018-19 Pansoleio League, as well as the Cup, and earned the right to participate in the 2019 STOK promotion play-offs. They won the competition, and were one of four teams to be promoted to the STOK Elite Division, the fourth tier of Cypriot football.

Omonia 29M were leading the 2019-20 STOK Elite Division, when the season was abandoned due to the COVID-19 pandemic. They were not named champions, but were awarded promotion to the Third Division. Their rapid rise of the Cypriot football hierarchy continued the following year, when the club won the 2020-21 Cypriot Third Division, and earned promotion to the Second Division. This also allowed them to participate in the Cypriot Cup.

In their first season competing in the Second Division, Omonia 29M finished 10th, with a record of 9 wins, 9 draws and 12 losses. They were knocked out of the 2021–22 Cypriot Cup by Pafos FC in the first round. Fans of Omonia 29M did not enter the stadium in protest of the supporter's card, which they had to present at the entrance, since the game involved a club from the first division.

Stadium 
Omonia 29Μ currently plays at the THOI Lakatamia Stadium, ground-sharing with Enosis Neon THOI Lakatamia. The stadium has a capacity of 3,500.

Honours 
• Cypriot Third Division

Winners(1): 2020-21

References

Football clubs in Cyprus
Association football clubs established in 2018
2018 establishments in Cyprus